The 1971 European Cup final was a football match between Ajax of the Netherlands and Panathinaikos of Greece on 2 June 1971 at Wembley Stadium. It was the final match of the 1970–71 season of Europe's premier cup competition, the European Cup. Ajax were appearing in their second final, having lost the 1969 final 4–1 to Italian team A.C. Milan. Panathinaikos were appearing in their first final.

Both teams progressed through four rounds to reach the final. Ajax comfortably won all of  their ties by two goals, except for their 5–1 aggregate victory against Swiss team Basel in the second round. Panathinaikos matches were close affairs, with the exception of their 7–1 aggregate victory against Jeunesse Esch of Luxembourg in the first round. Their quarter-final and semi-final victories were both won via the away goals rule.

Watched by a crowd of 83,179, Ajax took the lead in the 5th minute when Dick van Dijk scored. Ajax extended their lead in the 87th minute when a shot by Arie Haan deflected off defender Anthimos Kapsis and went into the Panathinaikos goal, giving Ajax its first European Cup victory by a score of 2–0.

Route to the final

Match

Details

See also
1970–71 European Cup
1971 Intercontinental Cup
AFC Ajax in European football
Panathinaikos F.C. in European football

External links
1970-71 season at UEFA website

1
European Cup Final 1971
European Cup Final 1971
1971
European Cup Final 1971
Euro
Euro
European Cup Final
European Cup Final